Califórnia da Canção Nativa (translated literally from Portuguese: California of the Native Song) is a yearly regional music festival in the state of Rio Grande do Sul, the southernmost state of Brazil.

The event first took place in 1971 and continues to be very successful to this day. The main focus of this festival is the celebration of the nativist Gaucho culture, values, world outlook, and history by way of music and song. The highest prize is the Calhandra de Ouro (Golden Lark). Competition finals are always hosted by the city of Uruguaiana.

Given its three decades-long successful history, the festival has become very popular and has received many accolades, including the prestigious official recognition, classifying it as one of the great statewide cultural institutions.

Winning compositions 

{| class="toccolours" border="1" cellpadding="2" style="border-collapse: collapse; text-align: center; width: 90%; margin: 0 auto;"
|- style= "background: #e2e2e2;"
|- style="background: #efefef;"
!width=5%|
!width=5%|Year
!width=30%|Song title
!width=30%|Songwriters
!width=30%|Played by
|- 
|align="center"|I
|align="center"|1971
|align="left"|Reflexão
|align="left"|Colmar Duarte e Júlio da Silva Filho
|align="left"|Cecília Machado e Os Marupiaras
|-
|align="center"|II
|align="center"|1972
|align="left"|Pedro Guará
|align="left"|Cláudio Boeira Garcia e José Cláudio Machado
|align="left"|Os Tapes
|-
|align="center"|III
|align="center"|1973
|align="left"|Canto de Morte de Gaudêncio Sete Luas
|align="left"|Luiz de Martino Coronel|Luiz Coronel e Marco Aurélio Vasconcellos
|align="left"|Rosa Maria
|-
|align="center"|IV
|align="center"|1974
|align="left"|Canção dos Arrozais 
|align="left"|José Hilário Retamozzo
|align="left"|Riograndino Oppa e Os Jaros
|-
|align="center"|V
|align="center"|1975
|align="left"|Roda Canto
|align="left"|Aparício Silva Rillo e Mario Barbará
|align="left"|Luiz Eugênio
|-
|align="center"|VI
|align="center"|1976
|align="left"|Um Canto para o Dia
|align="left"|Ernani Amaro Oliveira
|align="left"|Oristela Alves e César Passarinho
|-
|align="center"|VII
|align="center"|1977
|align="left"|Negro da Gaita 
|align="left"|Gilberto Carvalho e Airton Pimentel
|align="left"|César Passarinho
|-
|align="center"|VIII
|align="center"|1978
|align="left"|Pássaro Perdido
|align="left"|Gilberto Carvalho e Marco Aurélio Vasconcellos
|align="left"|Marco Aurélio Vasconcellos e Os Posteiros
|-
|align="center"|IX
|align="center"|1979
|align="left"|Esquilador
|align="left"|Telmo de Lima Freitas
|align="left"|Edson Otto e Os Cantores dos Sete Povos
|-
|align="center"|X
|align="center"|1980
|align="left"|Veterano
|align="left"|Antonio Augusto Ferreira|Antônio Augusto Ferreira e Everton dos Anjos Ferreira
|align="left"|Leopoldo Rassier e Os Serranos
|-
|align="center"|XI
|align="center"|1981
|align="left"|Desgarrados
|align="left"|Sérgio Napp e Mario Barbará
|align="left"|Mario Barbará
|-
|align="center"|XII
|align="center"|1982
|align="left"|Tertúlia 
|align="left"|Jader Moreci Teixeira|Leonardo
|align="left"|Jader Moreci Teixeira|Leonardo e Os Serranos
|-
|align="center"|XIII
|align="center"|1983
|align="left"|Guri
|align="left"|João Batista Machado e Júlio Machado da Silva Neto
|align="left"|César Passarinho
|-
|align="center"|XIV
|align="center"|1984
|align="left"|O Grito dos Livres
|align="left"|José Fernando Gonzales
|align="left"|Dante Ramon Ledesma
|-
|align="center"|XV
|align="center"|1985
|align="left"|Astro Aragano
|align="left"|Jerônimo Jardim
|align="left"|Jerônimo Jardim
|-
|align="center"|XVI
|align="center"|1986
|align="left"|Tropeiro do Futuro
|align="left"|Armando Vasquez e Adão Quintana Vieira
|align="left"|João Quintana Vieira e Grupo Parceria
|-
|align="center"|XVII
|align="center"|1987
|align="left"|Pampa Pietá
|align="left"|Dilan Camargo e Newton Bastos
|align="left"|Délcio Tavares
|-
|align="center"|XVIII
|align="center"|1988
|align="left"|Toada de Mango
|align="left"|Mauro Ferreira e Elton Saldanha
|align="left"|Elton Saldanha
|-
|align="center"|XIX
|align="center"|1989
|align="left"|Mandala das Esporas
|align="left"|Vaine Darde e Elton Saldanha
|align="left"|Elton Saldanha e Grupo
|-
|align="center"|XX
|align="center"|1990
|align="center" colspan="3" bgcolor="#e2e2e2"|Songs from the last 20 years (special edition)
|-
|align="center"|XXI
|align="center"|1991
|align="left"|Florêncio Guerra e seu Cavalo
|align="left"|Mauro Ferreira e Luiz Carlos Borges
|align="left"|João de Almeida Neto
|-
|align="center"|XXII
|align="center"|1992
|align="left"|O Minuano e o Poeta
|align="left"|Louro Simões e Clóvis de Souza
|align="left"|César Passarinho
|-
|align="center"|XXIII
|align="center"|1993
|align="left"|Domador dos Sesmarias
|align="left"|Elmo de Freitas (Carijó)
|align="left"|Elmo de Freitas (Carijó)
|-
|align="center"|XXIV
|align="center"|1994
|align="left"|Milonga-me
|align="left"|Vinícius Brum
|align="left"|Vinícius Brum
|-
|align="center"|XXV
|align="center"|1995
|align="left"|Querência
|align="left"|Silvio Aymone Genro e Getúlio Rodrigues
|align="left"|Nara Tavares
|-
|align="center"|XXVI
|align="center"|1996
|align="left"|Canto e Reflexão para a Província
|align="left"|Sérgio Rojas
|align="left"|Sérgio Rojas
|-
|align="center"|XXVII
|align="center"|1997
|align="left"|O Forasteiro
|align="left"|Vinicius Brum, Mauro Ferreiro e Luiz Carlos Borges
|align="left"|Luiz Marenco e Marco Aurélio Vasconcellos
|-
|align="center"|XXVIII
|align="center"|1998
|align="left"|O Nada
|align="left"|Rodrigo Bauer e Chico Saratt
|align="left"|Chico Saratt
|-
|align="center"|XXIX
|align="center"|1999
|align="left"|Poema Não Escrito
|align="left"|Tadeu Marfins e Lenin Nuñez
|align="left"| Maria Helena Anversa
|-
|align="center"|XXX
|align="center"|2001
|align="left"|Rastros de Ausência
|align="left"|Adão Quevedo e Mauro Marques
|align="left"|Vinícius Brum
|-
|align="center"|XXXI
|align="center"|2002
|align="left"|Feito o Carreto
|align="left"|Mauro Moraes
|align="left"|Pirisca Grecco
|-
|align="center"|XXXII
|align="center"|2003
|align="left"|Laçador de Barro
|align="left"|Antônio Augusto Ferreira, Mauro Ferreira e Luiz Carlos Borges
|align="left"|João de Almeida Neto
|-
|align="center"|XXXIII
|align="center"|2004
|align="left"|Muchas Gracias
|align="left"|Gujo Teixeira e Pirisca Grecco
|align="left"|Pirisca Grecco
|-
|align="center"|XXXIV
|align="center"|2005
|align="left"|Com os pés fincados no chão
|align="left"|Zeca Alves, Pirisca Grecco e Ricardo Martins
|align="left"|Pirisca Grecco
|-
|align="center"|XXXV
|align="center"|2007
|align="left"|Céu na terra, pelo rio
|align="left"|Tadeu Martins e Lenin Nuñez
|align="left"|Maurício Barcellos
|-
|align="center"|XXXVI
|align="center"|2009
|align="left"|A sanga do Pedro Lira
|align="left"|Demétrio Xavier e Marco Aurélio Vasconcellos
|align="left"|Marco Aurélio Vasconcellos
|-
|align="center"|XXXVII
|align="center"|2013
|align="left"|Petiço Mapa-Múndi
|align="left"|Rafael Ovídio da Costa Gomes, Fernando Saldanha Filho, Pedro Ribas e César Santos
|align="left"|César Santos
|-
|align="center"|XXXVIII
|align="center"|2014
|align="left"|O homem dentro do Espelho 
|align="left"|Martin Cesar e Pedro Guerra Pimentel
|align="left"|Cassiano Mendes e Pedro Guerra Pimentel
|-
|align="center"|XXXIX
|align="center"|2015
|align="center" colspan="3" bgcolor="#e2e2e2"|ULBRA's Orchestra remembers all successes from previous Califórnias (special edition)
|-
|align="center"|XXXX
|align="center"|2016
|align="center" colspan="3" bgcolor="#e2e2e2"|Celebration of the 45 years of the competition (special edition)
|-
|align="center"|XXXX
|align="center"|2017
|align="left"|Um Homem, um Cavalo e um Cachorro
|align="left"|Silvio Genro
|align="left"|Luiz Fernando Baldez e Ricardo Tubino
|-
|align="center"|'|align="center"|2018
|align="center" colspan="3" bgcolor="#e2e2e2"|Não houve por falta de recursos
|-
|align="center"|XXXXI
|align="center"|2019
|align="left"|Leilão de Aperos|align="left"|Flávio Saldanha e Nilton Ferreira
|align="left"|Flávio Saldanha e Nilton Ferreira
|-
|align="center"|XXXXI
|align="center"|2020
|align="left"|Milonga de Amor Perfeito'|align="left"|Jaime Vaz Brasil e Zé Alexandre|align="left"|Jaime Vaz Brasil e Grupo Mas Bah!|-
|}

This list, up to and including the year of 1999, has been widely cited as to have appeared in an official festival publication called Livro de Poemas Oficial da XXX Califórnia da Canção Nativa''.

Presidents 
 Henrique Dias de Freitas Lima - 1971 a 1973
 Colmar Pereira Duarte - 1974 a 1976
 Mauro Dante Aymone Lopes - 1977 a 1979
 Carlos Alberto da Rosa - 1980 a 1981
 Ricardo Pereira Duarte - 1982 a 1984
 Nelson José Pereira da Silva - 1985 a 1986
 Lourival Araújo Gonçalves - 1987 a 1989
 Mauro Dante Aymone Lopes - 1990
 Carlos Alberto da Rosa - 1991
 Luiz Machado Stabile - 1992
 José Mário Rodrigues de Freitas - 1993 a 1995
 José Antonio Marques Fagundes - 1996
 José Mário Rodrigues de Freitas - 1997 a 1998
 Lourival Araújo Gonçalves - 1999 a 2000
 Maurício Castanho Vidal - 2013
 Luiz Machado Stabile - 2014

See also 
 Culture in Rio Grande do Sul
 Erico Verissimo
 Ragamuffin War
 Jesuit Reductions
 Muckers
 Nheçu
 Sepé Tiaraju
 Guarani das Missões

References

External links
Dicionário Cravo Albin da Música Popular Brasileira: Festival Califórnia da Canção
Califórnia da Canção Nativa 2020
Califórnia da Canção Nativa 2017

Culture in Rio Grande do Sul
Rock festivals in Brazil
Rio Grande do Sul
Folk festivals in Brazil
Country music festivals in Brazil